is a Japanese football player who plays for Nara Club.

Career
Yohei Nishimura joined J3 League club Tochigi SC in 2016.

Club statistics
Updated to 29 December 2018.

References

External links

Profile at Fujieda MYFC

1993 births
Living people
University of Tsukuba alumni
Association football people from Hyōgo Prefecture
Sportspeople from Kobe
Japanese footballers
J3 League players
Tochigi SC players
Fujieda MYFC players
Association football defenders